Magnus Kjell (born 20 August 1958) is a Swedish sailor. He competed in the Flying Dutchman event at the 1984 Summer Olympics.

References

External links
 

1958 births
Living people
Swedish male sailors (sport)
Olympic sailors of Sweden
Sailors at the 1984 Summer Olympics – Flying Dutchman
Sportspeople from Stockholm